Kamen Rider Saber is a Japanese tokusatsu drama in Toei Company's Kamen Rider series produced by TV Asahi. It is the second series in the Reiwa period run and the 31st series overall.

In keeping with the series' storybook theme, the episodes are denominated as "chapters" while the titles are based on lines from fairy tales and fantasy books.

Episodes

References

Saber